Waln or WALN may refer to:

People
Frank Waln, a Sicangu Lakota rapper from South Dakota, United States
 Nora Waln (1895–1964) American journalist, author of The House of Exile
 Robert Waln (1765–1836) a United States Representative from Pennsylvania.

Other uses
WALN (FM), a radio station (89.3 FM) in Carrollton, Alabama, United States
Western Australia Landcare Network, an  affiliate of Landcare Australia